Boardwalk Empire Volume 3: Music from the HBO Original Series is a soundtrack for the HBO television series Boardwalk Empire, released on October 27, 2014. It features music heard in seasons 4 and 5 of the show. The album peaked at number ten on the Billboard Top Jazz Albums chart.

Track listing

Track listing adapted from AllMusic.

References 

2014 soundtrack albums
2014 compilation albums
Boardwalk Empire
Television soundtracks
Jazz soundtracks
ABKCO Records compilation albums
ABKCO Records soundtracks
Albums produced by Stewart Lerman